Plutonium fluoride can refer to:

 Plutonium trifluoride, PuF3
 Plutonium tetrafluoride, PuF4
 Plutonium hexafluoride, PuF6